Adelaar is a surname. Notable people with the surname include:

Christel Adelaar (1935–2013), Dutch actress
Frans Adelaar (born 1960), Dutch footballer and manager
K. Alexander Adelaar (born 1953), Dutch linguist
Willem Adelaar (born 1948), Dutch linguist

See also
Cort Adeler